

This is a list of the National Register of Historic Places in Harris County, Texas.  It is intended to be a complete list of properties and districts listed on the National Register of Historic Places in Harris County, Texas, United States.

Number of listings by area
The properties are distributed across Harris County.  There is a concentration in "Downtown Houston", defined as the area enclosed by Interstate 10, Interstate 45, and Interstate 69.  More than 100 are in the "Houston Heights" neighborhood whose borders are, approximately, Highway I-10 on the South, I-610 on the North, 45 on the East and Durham on the West.  The "inner Harris County" area is defined as the rest of the area within the Interstate 610 loop;  "outer Harris County" is defined as the rest of Harris County.  There are no listings at all in a few of Houston's exclaves, which extend even beyond the Harris County borders.

See also
List of National Historic Landmarks in Texas
National Register of Historic Places listings in Texas
Recorded Texas Historic Landmarks in Harris County

References

External links

 University of Houston Digital Library: vintage photo of the Houston Cotton Exchange Building in the early 20th−century

Harris